The 1948 USC Trojans football team represented the University of Southern California (USC) in the 1948 college football season. In their seventh year under head coach Jeff Cravath, the Trojans compiled a 6–3–1 record (4–2 against conference opponents), finished in third place in the Pacific Coast Conference, and outscored their opponents by a combined total of 142 to 87.

Schedule

Coaching staff
 Head coach: Jeff Cravath
 Assistant coaches: Bob Winslow, Sam Barry, Bob Snyder, Norm Verry, Roy Engle, Roy "Bullet" Baker, Raymond George

References

USC
USC Trojans football seasons
USC Trojans football